This is a list of Billboard magazine's Top Hot 100 songs of the year 1970. It covers from January 3 to November 28, 1970.

See also
1970 in music
List of Billboard Hot 100 number-one singles of 1970
List of Billboard Hot 100 top-ten singles in 1970

References

1970 record charts
Billboard charts